Severny is a settlement in the urban okrug of Maykop, Russia. The population was 1271 as of 2018. There are 51 streets.

Geography 
Severny is located 9 km north of Maykop (the district's administrative centre) by road. Severo-Vostochnye Sady is the nearest rural locality.

References 

Rural localities in Maykop Federal City